Gormley GO Station is a train and bus station in the GO Transit network located in Richmond Hill, Ontario, Canada, serving Oak Ridges and the Whitchurch–Stouffville community of Gormley. It was the terminus of the Richmond Hill line train service from when it opened on 5 December 2016 until 28 June 2021, when the line was extended north to Bloomington GO Station.

The station is located on the north side of Stouffville Road (York Regional Road 14) on the east side of the railway, west of Highway 404. It features a single platform with heated shelters and a snow-melting system, a station building, a bus loop, a kiss and ride and 850 car parking spaces. The station building has a Leadership in Energy and Environmental Design (LEED) Silver certification.

History

Historic Gormley station
In 1907 a two-storey station was built by the James Bay Railway, south of the original Stouffville Sideroad. The name of the company changed to the Canadian Northern Ontario Railway, and later to the Canadian Northern Railway and was ultimately merged into the Canadian National Railway in 1923.

The Gormley railway station was demolished in the early 1970s. Station Road, which once led to station, is now a narrow dead-end street that gives access to a few homes and businesses from Gormley Road.

Gormley GO Station
The Gormley GO Station was constructed north of Stouffville Road, approximately 600 metres north of the site of the historic train station.  A ribbon-cutting ceremony for the station was held on 1 December 2016, and regular service began on Monday 5 December 2016.

Construction of the station and its building cost approximately  million.  The station's construction was originally delayed due to environmental concerns, and started in 2014. A nearby layover train storage facility with capacity of six trains was built simultaneously, and cost about  million. The layover facility opened in 2014.

Services
As of September 2021, Gormley Station is served by five southbound train trips to Union Station on weekday mornings, and six northbound trips returning northbound on weekday evenings.  A handful of additional trips between Gormley and Union Station are operated by GO Transit bus route 61 outside of peak periods.

References

External links

GO Transit railway stations
Railway stations in Canada opened in 2016
Railway stations in Richmond Hill, Ontario
2016 establishments in Ontario